The Lathiceridae are a family of grasshoppers, in the Orthoptera: suborder Caelifera. Species in this family can be found in the desert regions of southern Africa where they resemble the stony ground on which they live. They are characterized by their apterous (wingless) bodies, which are dorsoventrally depressed and often excessively widened in the metathoracic region, giving them a spindle-like appearance. Their integument is sculptured and rugose, and their coloration varies from white to brown and purple, harmonizing with the color of the substratum on which they live.

Genera
The Orthoptera Species File lists:
 Batrachidacris Uvarov, 1939
 Crypsicerus Saussure, 1888
 Lathicerus Saussure, 1888

References

External links
 
 
 

Caelifera
Orthoptera families